Combs High School is a high school in San Tan Valley, Arizona. It is the only high school in the J.O. Combs Unified School District. It has arts, theater, orchestra, and band departments.

The J.O. Combs district community had to approve a unification vote in November 2006 for the district to be able to teach high school students.

In 2009 it opened its doors with Brenda Mayberry as the principal. The first graduating class was the class of 2012.

References

Educational institutions established in 2008
Public high schools in Arizona
Schools in Pinal County, Arizona
2008 establishments in Arizona